The Bishop of Basingstoke is an episcopal title used by a suffragan bishop of the Church of England Diocese of Winchester, in the province of Canterbury, England. The title takes its name after the town of Basingstoke in Hampshire. The previous bishop, Peter Hancock, was translated to be Bishop of Bath and Wells on 4 March 2014. On 26 June 2014, it was announced that David Williams, Vicar of Christ Church Winchester, was to be consecrated Bishop of Basingstoke, and he assumed the role on 19 September 2014 at a consecration service at Winchester Cathedral.

On 20 May 2021, it was reported that Tim Dakin, Bishop of Winchester, had "stepped back" as Bishop for six weeks, in light of the threat of a Diocesan Synod motion of no confidence in his leadership. Williams also "stepped back" and Debbie Sellin, Bishop of Southampton, served as acting diocesan bishop. Williams' leave was later extended to the end of August 2021.

List of bishops

References

External links
 Crockford's Clerical Directory - Listings

Bishops of Basingstoke
Anglican suffragan bishops in the Diocese of Winchester